The 2014 Black-Eyed Susan Stakes was the 90th running of the Black-Eyed Susan Stakes. The race took place on May 16, 2014, and was televised in the United States on the NBC Sports Network. Ridden by jockey Javier Castellano, Stopchargingmaria won the race by a scant neck over runner-up Vero Amore. Approximate post time on the Friday evening before the Preakness Stakes was 4:49 p.m. Eastern Time. The Maryland Jockey Club raised the purse to $500,000 for the 90th running. This made The Black-Eyed-Susan Stakes the third highest payout for a race restricted to three-year-old fillies. The race was run over a fast track in a final time of 1:51.79.  The Maryland Jockey Club reported total attendance of 34,756. The attendance at Pimlico Race Course that day was the second best crowd ever for Black-Eyed Susan Stakes Day behind only 2013.

Payout 

The 90th Black-Eyed Susan Stakes Payout Schedule

$2 Exacta:  (4–10) paid   $119.80

$2 Trifecta:  (4–10–9) paid   $871.40

$1 Superfecta:  (4–10–9–1) paid   $9,164.80

The full chart 

 Winning Breeder: Harvey Clarke & Brookdale Farm; (KY)  
 Final Time: 1:51.79
 Track Condition: Good
 Total Attendance: 34,756

See also 
 2014 Preakness Stakes
 Black-Eyed Susan Stakes Stakes "top three finishers" and # of  starters

References

External links 
 Official Black-Eyed Susan Stakes website
 Official Preakness website

2014 in horse racing
Horse races in Maryland
2014 in American sports
2014 in sports in Maryland
May 2014 sports events in the United States
Black-Eyed Susan Stakes